Catherine Musonda (born 20 February 1998) is a Zambian footballer who is a goalkeeper for Indeni Roses and the Zambia women's national team.

References

External links

1998 births
Living people
Zambian women's footballers
Women's association football goalkeepers
Zambia women's international footballers
Footballers at the 2020 Summer Olympics
Olympic footballers of Zambia